Laurence "Lloyd" Holder (born August 30, 1977) is a Bermudian soccer player who currently plays for the Bermuda Hogges in the USL Second Division.

Career

Club
Holder began his career in the Bermudian Premier Division, playing for both the Devonshire Colts and the Dandy Town Hornets, before joining the Bermuda Hogges in the USL Second Division in 2007.

International

References

External links

1977 births
Living people
Bermuda Hogges F.C. players
USL Second Division players
Association football defenders
Bermudian footballers
Bermuda international footballers